= Gotawa =

Village in Uttar Pradesh, India

Gotawa is a village/town in Prayagraj, Uttar Pradesh, India.
